The 2009 William & Mary Tribe football team represented the College of William & Mary during the 2009 NCAA Division I FCS football season. William & Mary competed as a member of the Colonial Athletic Association (CAA) under head football coach Jimmye Laycock and played their home games at Zable Stadium. The 2009 campaign came on the heels of a 7–4 record in 2008.

The 2009 Tribe football team finished the season ranked No. 4 in The Sports Network's final poll, which was the second highest final ranking William & Mary had ever earned; they finished No. 3 in 2004.

Schedule

Season summary

Regular season
On September 5, William & Mary opened their season against their academic rivals, the Virginia Cavaliers (UVa) in Charlottesville. UVa, an FBS team, was expected to win handily. However, the Tribe forced a UVa school record-tying seven turnovers and won the game 26–14. It was William & Mary's first win over Virginia since 1986 and their first over an FBS school since 1998 (a 45–38 win over Temple). Tribe redshirt freshman cornerback B.W. Webb intercepted three passes, including a 50-yard pick six late in the fourth quarter to seal the victory. Webb was named the College Football National Defensive Player of the Week by the press. This selection marked the first time since the award's inception in 2001 that any player from an FCS school earned the distinction. Webb's game-sealing third interception was also chosen as SportsCenter's #5 play of the day on its daily Top 10 Plays segment.

The October 3rd match-up pitted the #5 Tribe against the #2 Villanova Wildcats. Both teams headed into the contest with 4–0 (1–0 CAA) records. The 3:30 p.m. game was broadcast live on the Versus network, making it the first-ever nationally televised CAA football game. Villanova won the game 28–17.

After defeating the #8 New Hampshire Wildcats on November 14, the Tribe tied their program's best record through 10 games since the 1947 season. The victory improved William & Mary's record to 5–0 at home on the season, marking the first time since 2004 that they had posted an undefeated regular season mark at Zable Stadium.

Capital Cup showdown
The I-64 Trophy, given to the winner of the annual rivalry game with Richmond (dubbed the I-64 Bowl), was replaced in 2009 with the Capital Cup, which honors the entire 118-game history of the rivalry (through 2008) between the schools and the status of the two cities as the last two capitals of the Commonwealth of Virginia. Both the trophy and game's names were changed to be called the Capital Cup. The 2009 edition turned out to be the most anticipated match-up in the long series' history. Both teams headed into the regular season finale with 9–1 (6–1 CAA) records, and each of the teams' single losses came to Villanova. The #5 Tribe had matched their best record through 10 games since the 1947 season, while the #4 Spiders were also looking for their first 10-win regular season in school history. The game contained not only playoff seeding ramifications, but a minimum share of the conference title was also on the line (the winner of the UR–W&M game would be the CAA's outright winner if #2 Villanova were to be upset by #25 Delaware).

The game was a defensive struggle as most possessions resulted in three-and-outs or, at most, one or two first downs. Tied at 10 apiece with less than 20 seconds remaining in the 4th quarter, William & Mary attempted one last play in Richmond territory to move close enough for a game-winning field goal. However, Tribe quarterback R. J. Archer threw an interception  with 14 seconds left, giving the Spiders one last possession. After two pass completions covering close to 30 yards, Spiders kicker Andrew Howard converted a 48-yard field goal as time expired to give Richmond the win and a share of the conference title (Villanova would go on to win their game later that afternoon). Howard had only been 1-for-3 in field goal attempts prior to his game-winning kick.

Playoffs
With the loss, William & Mary finished the regular season 9–2 (6–2 CAA). When the FCS playoff bracket was announced, the #6 Tribe found out that they would be hosting the #15 Weber State Wildcats on November 28. In the first-ever meeting between the schools, William & Mary utilized a season-high four interceptions (two returned for touchdowns) to easily handle the Wildcats 38–0.

In the second round, William & Mary traveled to Carbondale, Illinois to take on the #1 ranked Southern Illinois Salukis. The Salukis boasted an offense that averaged more than 400 yards per game and over 34 points per game. After trailing 3–0 at the end of the first quarter, William & Mary's defense (#1 in the nation for rushing, #3 overall) stymied Southern Illinois for the remainder of the game and the Tribe stunned the host 24–3. The victory marked head coach Jimmye Laycock's 200th career victory (all at W&M), and also made him just the 13th FCS head coach to ever earn that many wins. It also helped the Tribe tie a single season school record of 11 wins which had been set back in 2004, the first and last time that they had reached the national semifinals.

On December 11 at 8:00 p.m., #6 William & Mary versus #2 Villanova met once again at Villanova Stadium for a national semifinal face-off. The game was broadcast live on ESPN2, and either winner of this match-up was going to make their first-ever national championship appearance in football. The Wildcats (12–1–0) came back from a 10–0 halftime deficit to defeat the Tribe for the second time in that season, 14–13. Villanova would then move on to defeat the Montana Grizzlies, 23–21, in the national championship.

References

William and Mary
William & Mary Tribe football seasons
William and Mary Tribe football